Ly Kvang Pann is the former minister of justice for Cambodia from 1973 to 1975.

References

Year of birth missing (living people)
Cambodian politicians
Possibly living people
Government ministers of Cambodia